Serge Cadorin  (7 September 1961 – 10 April 2007) was a Belgian football striker.

Cadorin began his professional career with R.F.C. de Liège in 1981, and he played for the club until 1983. Next, he moved to Portugal where he would play for several years before returning to Belgium. He played for Portimonense S.C. in the Portuguese Liga from 1983 to 1989, with one season at Associação Académica de Coimbra in between.

His father, Bruno Cadorin, was also a professional football player.

References

External links
Death notice on Enaos.net

1961 births
2007 deaths
People from Stavelot
Belgian footballers
RFC Liège players
Portimonense S.C. players
Associação Académica de Coimbra – O.A.F. players
Belgian expatriate footballers
Belgian expatriate sportspeople in Portugal
Association football forwards
Footballers from Liège Province